Calliostomatinae is a subfamily of gastropods, belonging to the family Calliostomatidae.

Description
They are somewhat large sea snails - marine gastropod mollusks, with gills and a thin, circular, corneous, and many-whorled operculum. Their shell is conical with angular periphery. The spiral sculpture consists of raised cords, in many cases strongly beaded. The protoconch has a raised hexagonal pattern. The columella is simple above, not folded, and either simply concave below or slightly truncate and toothed.  The radula has the rhachidian and 4 to 5 lateral teeth with irregularly oval body, and rather long, pointed cusps, their outer edges serrate. The inner marginal teeth are enlarged. The pseudo-proboscis of the animal is well developed

Species
 Akoya Habe, 1961
 Alertalex Dell, 1956
 Astele Swainson, 1855
 Astelena Iredale, 1924
 Bathyfautor Marshall, 1995
 Calliostoma Swainson, 1840
 Carinator Ikebe, 1942
 Dactylastele Marshall, 1995
 Dymares Schwengel, 1942
 Eucasta Dall, 1889
 Falsimargarita Powell, 1951
 Fautrix Marshall, 1995
 Fluxina Dall, 1881
 Laetifautor Iredale, 1929
 Neocalliostoma Castellanos & Fernandez, 1976
 Otukaia Ikebe, 1942
 Photinastoma Powell, 1951
 Photinula H. Adams & A. Adams, 1854
 Selastele B. A. Marshall, 1995
 Sinutor Cotton & Godfrey, 1935
 Tropidotrochus Parodiz, 1977
 Venustas Allan, 1926
 Ziziphinus Gray, 1842
Genera brought into synonymy
 Ampullotrochus Monterosato, 1890 : synonym of Calliostoma (Ampullotrochus) Monterosato, 1890 represented as Calliostoma Swainson, 1840
 Benthastelena Iredale, 1936 : synonym of Calliostoma Swainson, 1840
 Calliotropis Oliver, 1926 : synonym of Calliostoma (Maurea) Oliver, 1926 represented as Calliostoma Swainson, 1840
 Callistele Cotton & Godfrey, 1935 : synonym of Astele Swainson, 1855
 Callistoma Herrmannsen, 1846 : synonym of Calliostoma Swainson, 1840
 Callistomus Herrmannsen, 1846 : synonym of Calliostoma Swainson, 1840
 Calotropis Thiele, 1929 : synonym of Calliostoma (Maurea) Oliver, 1926 represented as Calliostoma Swainson, 1840
 Conulus Nardo, 1841 : synonym of Calliostoma Swainson, 1840
 Coralastele Iredale, 1930 : synonym of Astele Swainson, 1855
 Elmerlinia Clench & Turner, 1960 : synonym of Calliostoma Swainson, 1840
 Eutrochus A. Adams, 1864 : synonym of Astele Swainson, 1855
 Fautor Iredale, 1924 : synonym of Calliostoma (Fautor) Iredale, 1924 represented as Calliostoma Swainson, 1840
 Jacinthinus Monterosato, 1889 : synonym of Calliostoma Swainson, 1840
 Kingotrochus Ihering, 1902 : synonym of Photinula H. Adams & A. Adams, 1854
 Kombologion Clench & Turner, 1960 : synonym of Calliostoma Swainson, 1840
 Leiotrochus Conrad, 1862 : synonym of Calliostoma Swainson, 1840
 Maurea Oliver, 1926 : synonym of Calliostoma (Maurea) Oliver, 1926 represented as Calliostoma Swainson, 1840
 Mauriella Oliver, 1926 : synonym of Calliostoma (Maurea) Oliver, 1926 represented as Calliostoma Swainson, 1840
 Mucrinops Finlay, 1926 : synonym of Calliostoma (Maurea) Oliver, 1926 represented as Calliostoma Swainson, 1840
 Omphalotukaia Yoshida, 1948 : synonym of 'alliostoma Swainson, 1840
 Photina H. Adams & A. Adams, 1853 : synonym of Photinula H. Adams & A. Adams, 1854
 Salsipotens Iredale, 1924 : synonym of Astele Swainson, 1855
 Spicator Cotton & Godfrey, 1935 : synonym of Laetifautor Iredale, 1929
 Tristichotrochus Ikebe, 1942 : synonym of Calliostoma (Benthastelena) Iredale, 1936 represented as Calliostoma Swainson, 1840
 Venustas Finlay, 1927 : synonym of Calliostoma (Maurea) Oliver, 1926 represented as Calliostoma Swainson, 1840
 Zizyphinus Gray, 1847 : synonym of Ziziphinus Gray, 1842

References

 Bouchet P. & Rocroi J.-P. (2005) Classification and nomenclator of gastropod families. Malacologia 47(1-2): 1-397

Calliostomatidae